St Michael's Church is in Townley Street, Middleton, Greater Manchester, England. It is an active Anglican parish church in the deanery of Heywood and Middleton, the archdeaconry of Rochdale, and the diocese of Manchester. The church is recorded in the National Heritage List for England as a designated Grade II listed building.

History

The church was built in 1901–02 replacing an earlier church on the site dating from 1839. It was paid for by J. W. Lees, a brewer.  It was designed by the Lancaster firm of architects, Austin and Paley. At this time only the east end and the first bay of the nave were built.  The nave was completed in 1911, and the tower was added between 1926 and 1931 at a cost of £6,656,

Architecture

St Michael's is constructed in stone with a tile roof. Its architectural style is Perpendicular. The plan consists of a four-bay nave with a clerestory, north and south aisles, a chancel with a side chapel, vestry and organ chamber, and a virtually free-standing tower to the west of the north aisle. At the west end of the church is a canted baptistry. The tower is in four stages, with bands separating the stages. It has angle buttresses, an octagonal stair turret, a doorway over which is a four-light window, clock faces, three-light bell openings, and a castellated parapet. The windows along the sides of the aisles have two, three or four lights with flat heads; those in the clerestory have three lights under round-arched heads. Both the east and west windows have five lights. Inside the church the arcades are carried on octagonal piers. Most of the stained glass is by Shrigley and Hunt.

See also

List of churches in Greater Manchester
Listed buildings in Middleton, Greater Manchester
List of ecclesiastical works by Austin and Paley (1895–1916)
List of ecclesiastical works by Austin and Paley (1916–44)

References
Citations

Sources

 
 

Church of England church buildings in Greater Manchester
Grade II listed churches in the Metropolitan Borough of Oldham
Anglican Diocese of Manchester
Austin and Paley buildings
Gothic Revival church buildings in England
Gothic Revival architecture in Greater Manchester
Churches completed in 1930
20th-century Church of England church buildings
Middleton, Greater Manchester